David Asscherick is the co-founder of ARISE (not to be confused with Arise Church in New Zealand). David pastored the Kingscliff Seventh-day Adventist church in Chinderah, New South Wales, Australia from 2014 to early 2020. He is also the former pastor of the Troy Seventh-day Adventist Church in Troy, Michigan. In 2011, ARISE merged with Light Bearers and David became co-director of Light Bearers. He has been featured on 3ABN and Hope Channel.

A former punk rocker, David became a Seventh-day Adventist Christian at the age of 23 and went on to become a pastor, co-founder of ARISE and author of God in Pain.

References

External links
Articles by Asscherick as catalogued in the Seventh-day Adventist Periodical Index (SDAPI)
Kingscliff Seventh-day Adventist Church and their Youtube channel

1972 births
American Seventh-day Adventists
American Seventh-day Adventist ministers
History of the Seventh-day Adventist Church
American television evangelists
Living people
Place of birth missing (living people)